The Qarabağ 2022–23 season was Qarabağ's 30th Azerbaijan Premier League season and their fourteenth season under manager Gurban Gurbanov. As well as the Azerbaijan Premier League, Qarabağ will also participate in the Azerbaijan Cup and the inaugural season of the UEFA Europa Conference League.

Season overview 
On 4 January, Qarabağ and Krasnodar agreed the transfer of Kady to the Russian club.

On 5 January, Qarabağ announced that Marko Vešović had extended his contract with the club until 30 June 2025. On 10 January, Qarabağ announced that Shakhruddin Magomedaliyev had extended his contract with the club until 30 June 2026.

On 13 January, Qarabağ announced the signing of Adama Diakhaby on a contract until 30 June 2025.

On 24 January, Qarabağ announced the signing of Redon Xhixha from Tirana on a contract until 30 June 2026.

On 26 January, Qarabağ announced the signing of Yassine Benzia from Dijon on a contract until 30 June 2025.

On 30 January, Owusu Kwabena left Qarabağ to join Ferencváros.

Squad

Out on loan

Transfers

In

Out

Loans out

Released

Friendlies

Competitions

Overview

Premier League

Results summary

Results by round

Results

League table

Azerbaijan Cup

UEFA Champions League

Qualifying rounds

UEFA Europa League

Group stage

UEFA Europa Conference League

Knockout round play-off

Squad statistics

Appearances and goals 

|-
|colspan="16"|Players away on loan:
|-
|colspan="16"|Players who left Qarabağ during the season:

|}

Goal scorers

Clean sheets

Disciplinary record

References

External links 
 Official Website

Qarabağ FK seasons
Qarabağ
Qarabağ
Qarabağ
Azerbaijani football clubs 2022–23 season